The Agents were an English post-punk band formed in 1980 in Bristol, England. The band formed from the remnants of several bands that were playing the American Military bases circuit in Europe in the 1970s.  The band were based in Mannheim, Germany and the lineup consisted of vocalist Swig (real name Richard Snow), guitarist Dave Libby, bassist Larry Burr and drummer Nick Bahra. The band were known for an exciting live act and built up a big following in Europe. In 1981 they released "Everybody's Gonna Be Happy", a single printed in green vinyl with a gatefold sleeve. The album (of the same name), release the same year on X Records, produced by Ingo Schantz.

The lineup was expanded in 1982 with keyboard player Steve Libby (brother of Dave) from Bristol band Stereo Models, moving the sound from post-punk to new wave. They returned to the studio in 1982 and recorded several tracks for the follow-up album. However, due to lack of promotion by X Records (Teldec) the band decided to change record labels. Years of touring Europe had taken its toll on the band and they returned to the UK, but split up before finding another deal. The album Everybody's Gonna Be Happy was never released as a CD and Teldec has been taken over, so it seems unlikely that the album will ever be re-released. However, secondhand copies of the album and single are popular with collectors of new wave music. Richard Snow, Dave and Steve Libby went on to form the new wave electronic band Force Majeure.

Discography
Everybody's Gonna Be Happy (album, X Records, 1981)
"Everybody's Gonna Be Happy" (single, X Records, 1982)

See also
List of Bands from Bristol

References

English new wave musical groups
English post-punk music groups
Musical groups established in 1980
Musical groups disestablished in 1983
Musical groups from Bristol